Heathenry, heathenism or heathendom may refer to:

 Paganism
 Heathenry (new religious movement), a form of modern paganism

See also 
 Heathen (disambiguation)